Rạch Giá is a provincial city and the capital city of Kiên Giang province, Vietnam. East of city, it borders Tân Hiệp and Châu Thành town, the Gulf of Thailand is to the west and surrounds some parts of the city, south of the city is Châu Thành and An Biên town, and to the north it borders Hòn Đất and Tân Hiệp.

Administrative units
Rạch Giá was upgraded from a town to a city by Government Decree No. 97/2005/NĐ-CP on July 26, 2005. The city has 12 administrative units:
Vĩnh Thanh Vân Ward
Vĩnh Thanh Ward
Vĩnh Lạc Ward
Vĩnh Lợi Ward
Vĩnh Quang Ward
An Hòa Ward
An Bình Ward
Rạch Sỏi Ward
Vĩnh Thông Ward
Vĩnh Hiệp Ward
Phi Thông Commune

Rạch Giá is the first city where the Vietnamese government applied a "lấn biển" project to build out to the ocean to expand territory. The "lấn biển" project expanded the city to become one of the biggest new cities in southwest Vietnam. This project added 2 more new wards in Rạch Giá. Besides that, several future construction projects such as industrial center Rach Vuot and urban city Vĩnh Hiệp which will be started after finishing Lạc Hồng Bridge will expand Rạch Giá to the east.

Cultures and tourism
Ceremony of Nguyễn Trung Trực is held annually in lunar August.

Historic
National historical sites:
Nguyễn Trung Trực temple
Tam Bảo pagoda
Vĩnh Hoà temple
Huỳnh Mẫn Đạt grave
Phật Lớn pagoda
Láng Cát pagoda
Kiên Giang museum
Quan Đế pagoda

Other historical sites:
Sắc Tứ Tam Bảo Temple
Tam quan gate. This is the historical main gate and the symbol of Rạch Giá City.
Nguyễn Hiền Điều temple
Suông council
Bắc Đế temple
Thiên Hậu temple
Thiên Hậu Palace

Climate
Rạch Giá has a tropical savanna climate (Köppen Aw), not quite wet enough to be classified as a tropical monsoon climate (Am) though wetter than most climates of its type. There is a very pronounced dry season from December to March, but rainfall is consistently heavy for the remaining eight months of the year.

Transportation

Rạch Giá has 2 main stations: Rạch Sỏi station (main routes to neighbor towns or provinces on highway 61 and 63) and Rạch Giá station (main routes to Ho Chi Minh City and Hà Tiên). Those are the main stations to transport passengers to other towns in the province, or to other provinces in Vietnam.

The bus transportation system was developed pretty early. Passengers can take the bus from Rạch Giá to 4 other towns: Châu Thành (route Rạch Giá – Tắc Cậu), Giồng Riềng (route Rạch Giá – Giồng Riềng), Tân Hiệp (route Rạch Giá – Kinh B), Hòn Đất (route Rạch Giá – Tám Ngàn).

Currently, Rạch Giá Airport is the biggest airport in Rạch Giá. Rạch Giá airport has flight routes to Ho Chi Minh City with Vietnam Airlines.

Rạch Giá has 2 big ship stations: Rạch Giá ship station or Phú Quốc ship station (routes to Phú Quốc island and other big islands such as Phú Quốc, Hon Tre, Hòn Sơn and Thổ Chu) and Rạch Mẽo station (route to rural towns of Cà Mau Peninsula). High speed ship is the economic choice for passengers to Phú Quốc island or Kiên Hải islands.

References

External links

Populated places in Kiên Giang province
Districts of Kiên Giang province
Provincial capitals in Vietnam
Cities in Vietnam